Tawfiq Younes, also known as Tawfik Yunes, is a retired Major General who was head of the internal branch of the Syrian General Intelligence Directorate (GID), also known as Branch 251 from 2011 to 2016. In 2011, the European Union sanctioned him for "being involved in violence against the civilian population during the Syrian uprisings". He is also sanctioned by Britain and Canada.

References 

People of the Syrian civil war
Syrian Alawites
Syrian generals
People from Tartus

Syrian individuals subject to the European Union sanctions
Syrian individuals subject to United Kingdom sanctions